Rock Point is an unincorporated community and census-designated place in Charles County, Maryland, United States.

Description
Rock Point is located near Cobb Island at the mouth of the Wicomico River. As of the 2010 census, it had a population of 107.

Rock Point was named for the rockfish, or striped bass. Today Rock Point is largely a vacation land, but in the early 20th century, Rock Point had a large hotel serving summer vacationers and winter duck hunters, a steamboat wharf and warehouse, and a sizable general store. Fish were caught by a net hauled between two boats at some distance from each other, a method then called "Hauling Seine".  Rock Point also had an oyster shucking and packing plant, which served as a crab steaming and picking plant during the summer months, enabling the shipment of finfish, oysters and crabs in season to restaurants in Washington, D.C. and Baltimore. The packing house was owned by three prominent Rock Point families, named after two of them as "Hill & Lloyd" with the third (silent) partner being one John William Furbush (1882-1963). Today, Furbush Road at Rock Point is named after him. One of his descendants, a grandson, James Carroll Simms (1928–present), is the author of Searching for Identity, Truth and Meaning.

General Billy Mitchell, a duck hunter, was a regular patron during these early years. Earlier, Rock Point had become a center of Confederate activity, and was occupied by 300 Union troops throughout the Civil War. Columbus Lancaster, who owned the old general store, was arrested and put in the Old Capitol Prison in Washington on suspicion of collaborating with the Confederates. Rock Hall is the ancestral home of the Lancaster family, and was originally the  dowry of Elizabeth Neale at her wedding to John Lancaster in 1731. As of 2009, this home has been owned by the same family since it was granted to James Neale in 1641, as part of Wolleston Manor.

"Charleston" was an  plantation, worked by 100 slaves, on Charleston Creek, north of Rock Point. The plantation was part of Wolleston Manor. Its owner in the early 19th century was Daniel Jenifer, a minister to Austria and a member of the United States Congress. Henry Clay and Daniel Webster were among the many prominent guests whom Jenifer entertained at Wolleston Manor.

Demographics

Notable person
 William Colby, former Director of Central Intelligence

References

Census-designated places in Maryland
Census-designated places in Charles County, Maryland